The Treasure of Makuba, also known as El tesoro de Makuba, is a 1967 Spanish film directed by José María Elorrieta and starring Cameron Mitchell.

Cast
 Cameron Mitchell as Coogan
 Mara Cruz as Maroa
 Jessie Paradise as Mary
 Todd Martin as Hank
 Al Mulock as Pat
 José Luis Lluch as Tony
 Heriberto Pastor Serrador as Duval
 Felix Noble as Chief Maola
 Walter Zamudio as Ling

External links
 

1967 films
Spanish adventure films
1960s Spanish-language films
Films produced by Sidney W. Pink
Films directed by José María Elorrieta
1960s English-language films
American adventure films
1960s American films
1960s Spanish films